Vlado Sirvoň (born 8 July 1951) is a Slovak volleyball player. He competed in the men's tournament at the 1980 Summer Olympics.

References

1951 births
Living people
Slovak men's volleyball players
Olympic volleyball players of Czechoslovakia
Volleyball players at the 1980 Summer Olympics
People from Myjava
Sportspeople from the Trenčín Region